Los Angeles City Council District 13 is one of the 15 districts of the Los Angeles City Council, in Central Los Angeles.  Hugo Soto-Martinez is the current council member.

Geography

Present district

The district flanks the 101 freeway as it passes through part of Hollywood and north to Hollywood Boulevard in East Hollywood. The district's southern boundary includes the neighborhoods of Silver Lake, Echo Park, and Westlake; and north through Echo Park and western Elysian Park in the eastern Santa Monica Mountains; to Atwater Village, Elysian Valley, and a section of the Los Angeles River within its northeastern borders.

At , it is geographically the smallest council district in Los Angeles. It is also the most densely populated council district.

For more details, see the official City of Los Angeles map of District 13.

Historic locations
The 13th District was mapped at its origin in 1925 in the eastern part of the city, but over the years it has been shifted west in keeping with the city's population changes.

A new city charter effective in 1925 replaced the former "at large" voting system for a nine-member council with a district system with a 15-member council. Each district was to be approximately equal in population, based upon the voting in the previous gubernatorial election; thus redistricting was done every four years. (At present, redistricting is done every ten years, based upon the preceding U.S. census results.) The numbering system established in 1925 for City Council districts began with No. 1 in the north of the city, the San Fernando Valley, and ended with No. 15 in the south, the Harbor area.

Rough boundaries or descriptions of the 13th District have been as follows:

1925. In the eastern part of the city, covering Monterey Hills, Montecito Heights,  Elysian Park and part of Echo Park. It was described as the "North End, extending to Mt. Washington Drive, Avenue 44 and Marmion Way."

1926. "Old North End," with district headquarters at 3014 Terry Place.

1932–33. East boundary: Sheffield Street. South: Alhambra Avenue. West: Benton Way. North: An irregular line from Pullman Street to Fountain Avenue.

1940. Essentially the same as before, but with the district extended westward to Vermont Avenue and south to Valley Boulevard.

1960. The 13th District took over most of Hollywood. It extended from the Alhambra city limits to Fairfax Avenue.

1964. Hollywood, Silver Lake, Echo Park and portions of Los Feliz and Lincoln Heights.

1973. Touches Eagle Rock on the east and reaches into Hollywood on the west.

1975. Highland Park, Hollywood, Hollywood Hills, Los Feliz, Silver Lake, Atwater, Glassell Park, Cypress Park, Elysian Valley, Mount Washington and parts of Echo Park and Eagle Rock.

1986.  After several attempts at redrawing councilmanic districts in accordance with a U.S. court order to provide for increased Latino representation, the City Council in 1986 adopted a plan that stripped Chinatown, Echo Park and adjoining areas from the 13th District but kept Hollywood and Silver Lake and also cut north into Studio City.
The result was a decided shift to the north and west, including part of Studio City within the San Fernando Valley and all of Coldwater Canyon. The eastern boundary was roughly the east edge of Elysian Park.

Population
Sixty percent of district residents are foreign-born —  62 percent Latino, 16 percent white, 16 percent Asian American, 3 percent African American, and 3 percent American Indian, Mixed Race or other. The district has significant populations of Mexican, Central American, Filipino, Armenian, Korean, Thai, Cambodian, African and Chinese immigrants.

More than 80 percent of residents are renters, and the median household income is $24,074.  Forty percent of children live in poverty. Sixteen percent of residents have no education beyond the sixth grade and 46 percent have no high school diploma; 17 percent have a bachelor's degree or higher.  The average household size is 2.9 persons.  Thirty percent of the population is under 20 years, while 11 percent is over 60.

District 13 also has a large LGBT population, and is the site of the historic Black Cat Tavern, where, in 1967, an LGBT+ uprising took place. In 2017, to mark the fiftieth anniversary of this event, the local City Council office hosted a commemoration.

Officeholders
Fourteen men and two women have represented this district. This is the largest number of people to have represented any City Council district.

References

Note: Access to most Los Angeles Times links requires the use of a library card.

External links
 Official Los Angeles City Council District 13 website

Los Angeles City Council districts
LACD13
LACD13
LACD13
LACD13
LACD13
LACD13
LACD13
LACD13
LACD13
LACD13
LACD13
LACD13
LACD13